The Lost Paradise is a 1985 Spanish film directed by Basilio Martín Patino. It stars Charo López alongside Alfredo Landa, Juan Diego, Miguel Narros, Ana Torrent and Paco Rabal.

Plot 
A unnamed mature woman, daughter of a Spanish Republican exiled lecturer, returns to her parents' country, where she meets a number of people from her past, including Miguel, Benito, Lorenzo and an unnamed Socialist politician. She translates Hölderlin's Hyperion in the family house.

The film, an expression of the disenchantment experienced after the Spanish transition, underpins a criticism to the transition itself and the so-called pacto del olvido.

Cast

Production 
Shooting locations included Ávila, Toro, Salamanca, Madrid and Zamora.

Release 
The film screened at the 42nd Venice International Film Festival in August 1985. It was theatrically released on 17 October 1985.

Reception 
Ángel Fernández-Santos of El País, considered The Lost Paradise to be a "prodigiously assembled" film, to which the camera of Alcaine "bordering on the sublime" and the musical score's intensity and coupling add up, filling it "with rare beauty", while noting that it featured a couple of events (two additions of "foreign coarseness") totally out of place.

See also 
 List of Spanish films of 1985

Informational notes

References

Bibliography 
 
 
 
 

1980s Spanish-language films
1985 drama films
Spanish drama films
Films shot in Madrid
Films shot in the province of Ávila
Films shot in the province of Salamanca
Films shot in the province of Zamora
Films set in the 1980s